The Flinders Bay Branch Railway, also known as the Boyanup to Flinders Bay Section ran between Boyanup and Flinders Bay, in South Western Western Australia. The section from Flinders Bay to Busselton has now been converted into a rail trail for bushwalkers and cyclists, called the Wadandi Trail.

History
The first section of this line was constructed between Karridale and Boranup in May 1884, forming part of the M.C. Davies Timber horse-drawn tramway system, which soon ran between the jetties at Hamelin Bay and Flinders Bay. Access to both jetties allowed timber to be loaded onto ships in all seasons, as the original west-facing Hamelin Bay jetty typically experienced poor conditions during the winter. Some parts of the system were originally constructed using wooden rails and along steep alignments, oriented towards lower cost, rough workings of the timber tramway system. Locomotives were used instead of horses from 1895 and by the 1900 the network spanned from Flinders Bay to Margaret River.

Following the opening of the Bunbury to Boyanup Railway in 1891, a branch from Boyanup to Busselton was constructed by Smith & Tims, opening on 21 November 1894.

The railway between Margaret River and Flinders Bay was purchased by the Government in 1912 and was run as an isolated system by the Public Works Department for a few years. After some years of no service, the railway south of Witchcliffe was rehabilitated, including the construction of a realignment north of Jarrahdene. It was formally taken over by the Western Australian Government Railways (WAGR) and opened for service on 1 April 1925. This followed the opening of the WAGR line between Busselton and Witchcliffe (along a new alignment between Margaret River and Witchcliffe) on 20 October 1924.

Although a slow service due to the lighter rails and steep gradients, the branch was important for the dairy industry in the region. Usually known as the Flinders Bay branch, it ran until 1957. It was one of three branches in the WAGR system that relied on the important Msa garratt steam engine to be able to move the loads over steep and difficult gradients.
Most of the railway formation and structures were removed close to closure. The Flinders Bay engine shed, and some parts of the railway yard were not immediately removed and remained intact until the late 1950s. A limited number of photographs exist of the stopping platform at Flinders Bay, but very few exist of the Flinders Bay Jetty. At one stage in the 1970s, Railway Bus Drivers had the opportunity to stay overnight in a small railway cottage/shed at the bay-side edge of the Flinders Bay yard.

Alignment

Only the first section of the line (Boyanup to RGC) remains in place, although disused, with few changes since it was last operated. The remainder of the line has been lifted, although the rail reserve as far as Busselton remains under the control of the Public Transport Authority and is theoretically available for future rail uses.

Like all railways outside of Perth, the line was not electrified and predominantly single-track, with passing loops at various locations. The remnant section, from Boyanup to RGC, is controlled by Arc Infrastructure.

Heading south west from Boyanup, the line traverses predominantly agricultural land to a few kilometres beyond Capel, where it terminates at the former Iluka Resources RGC site. From here, the line continued through a mix of agricultural and forested land to Busselton. Part of the corridor west of Wonnerup has been used to accommodate the widening of the Bussell Highway. Within Busselton the line ran past the jetty and along the foreshore, turning south through what is now the Busselton Health Campus. Heading west again along the route of what is now the Bussell Highway, the line served Vasse and Quindalup before turning south towards Flinders Bay. The line passed through forested and agricultural areas, including several municipally heritage-registered mill sites in the M.C. Davies timber concession area south of Margaret River.

Branches

This line was the first branch from the Northcliffe line, at Boyanup, linking Busselton to the WAGR network. The only WAGR line to branch from this one is the Nannup Branch, which runs south from Wonnerup to Nannup. This section of this line from Wonnerup to Maryvale follows the alignment of Western Australia's first railway - the Ballaarat Tramway.

Timber Tramways

Several timber mills used to operate along the railway, each with their own access to the mainline. Many of these mills operated extensive timber tramways that fed significant quantities of timber to the railway. The section from Witchcliffe to Flinders Bay was originally built as an M.C. Davies horse-drawn tramway, before being bought by the Government and upgraded to a WAGR line in 1925.

Wadandi Track
In 2012 the Adelaide-based firm Mulloway was creating an interpretation plan for the Busselton to Flinders Bay Railway Rail Trail project, that would convert the former railway reserve into a recreational, tourism, and educational trail. Initially the track was called the Rails to Trails track.

The City of Busselton and the Shire of Augusta–Margaret River developed the rail alignment into the Wadandi Track rail trail, finishing on the Busselton foreshore. The sections from Busselton Jetty to the Carbunup River east of Marybrook and Cowaramup to Witchcliffe were completed in August 2020. The track takes its name from the traditional owners of the area, the Wadandi people, whose name means "people of the sea".

Notes

References
 Higham, Geoffrey Where was that? An Historical Gazetteer of Western Australia, Winthrop, W.A. Geoproject Solutions Pty Ltd.  

Closed railway lines in Western Australia
1957 disestablishments in Australia
1925 establishments in Australia
Flinders Bay, Western Australia